Stardust is the 17th book in Robert B. Parker's  Spenser series and first published in 1990.

Plot 
Spenser investigates the stalking of Jill Joyce, a TV star. 
Private investigator Spenser takes on a bodyguarding job, to protect a television actress, Jill Joyce, who has been getting harassing phone calls. While at first there is speculation that the attractive, alcohol-loving star may be exaggerating the incidents for attention, Spenser realizes there is a serious danger when her stunt double is murdered. 

This book also features the first appearances of recurring Spenser characters Del Rio, Chollo, and Bobby Horse.

References

1990 American novels
American detective novels